Rodney Gladwell (1928–1979) was a British artist born in Didcot, Oxfordshire, England whose paintings "hover between abstraction and figuration and play on this ambiguity".

Between 1949-1950, he followed in the foot steps of one of the greatest figurative painters of the 20th Century Amedeo Modigliani and studied in Paris at the Académie Colarossi. His work varied but a continual theme was his "heavily stylised female nudes". He exhibited in London and Paris with the Piccadilly Gallery, before being taken on by the gallery owner Lucy Wertheim and towards the end of his career the noted Swiss dealer .

In the 1960s, he undertook several large commissions to paint extensive murals for Sussex University (where he was later given a retrospective exhibition) and the Georgian Club in London. His work is held by the Arts Council of Great Britain and University of Johannesburg.
In the 1970s, his work fell out of favour and he disappeared from the art scene.

References 

1979 deaths
1928 births
20th-century English painters
English male painters
English muralists
Académie Colarossi alumni
20th-century English male artists